Philagraulella is a genus of moths belonging to the family Tineidae. It contains only one species, Philagraulella punica, which is found in Sudan.

References

Endemic fauna of Sudan
Tineidae
Monotypic moth genera
Moths of Africa
Tineidae genera